The Capt. Joel Whitney House is a historic house at 8 Pleasant Street in Phillips, Maine.  Built in 1829 for a prominent early settler and businessman, it is one of the oldest houses in the small inland community, and probably the only two-story building of that age.  It is now owned by the Phillips Historical Society, which houses museum displays in the rear sections.  The house was listed on the National Register of Historic Places in 2003.

Description and history
The Whitney House is set at the southeast corner of Pleasant and Sawyer Streets, opposite Sawyer Street from the Union Church.  The house is a rambling structure, with a -story side-gable main block, a long single-story ell extending to the rear, which joins to a square two-story carriage house with a cupola-topped hip roof.  The main facade is five bays wide, with a central entrance flanked by sidelight windows and topped by a wooden fan set in an elaborate entablature in the Federal style.  The rear ell was built in two stages, the first being integral to the house construction and the second added later.  The carriage house has large sliding doors on two sides, with a large hay portal over the southern entrance.  The interior of the main house has retained much of its original Federal period woodwork and hardware; the rear sections have been adapted for use as display, meeting, and library spaces by the historical society.

The town of Phillips was incorporated in 1812.  Captain Joel Whitney arrived with his family sometime between 1806 and 1815, bought  of land, and soon became a man of local prominence.  Lands he owned became part of Phillips village, he operated a saw mill and potash factory, and he served as an early postmaster.  He donated the land for the adjacent Union Church, helped finance its construction, and donated the bell in its tower.  This house was built for Whitney in 1829 by Jesse Ladd, a local housewright, some of whose other houses have survived.  This is the only known two-story house of the period to survive in Phillips—all the others are -story Capes.

See also
National Register of Historic Places listings in Franklin County, Maine

References

External links
 Visit Maine: Phillips Historical Society

Houses on the National Register of Historic Places in Maine
Federal architecture in Maine
Italianate architecture in Maine
Houses completed in 1829
Houses in Franklin County, Maine
Museums in Franklin County, Maine
History museums in Maine
National Register of Historic Places in Franklin County, Maine
Phillips, Maine